William Knox-Leet VC CB (3 November 1833 in Dalkey, County Dublin – 29 June 1898), was an Irish recipient of the Victoria Cross, the highest and most prestigious award for gallantry in the face of the enemy that can be awarded to British and Commonwealth forces.

Leet was 45 years old, and a Major in the 1st Bn., 13th Regiment of Foot (later The Somerset Light Infantry (Prince Albert's)), British Army during the Anglo-Zulu War when the following deed took place on 28 March 1879 at Battle of Hlobane, Zululand, South Africa for which he was awarded the Victoria Cross: 

During the Third Anglo-Burmese War (1885–87), then-Colonel Knox-Leet commanded the Infantry's 2nd Battalion, of which 144 men lost their lives in battle. Their names are listed on the Burma Memorial in Taunton, Somersetshire. This was the 2nd Battalion's first operation. Knox-Leet was eventually promoted to Major General.

He married Charlotte Elizabeth Anne Sherlock, a daughter of Thomas Henry Sherlock and Mary Catherine Kingston of Bandon, Co. Cork, Ireland. They had two sons, Bertie Fielding Knox Leet and Dudley Knox Leet. William retired in July 1887, died in Great Chart, Kent, on 29 June 1898. A memorial to him is in Great Chart Churchyard.

His Victoria Cross is displayed at the Somerset Light Infantry Museum, located in Taunton, Somerset, England.

References

The Register of the Victoria Cross (1981, 1988 and 1997)

Ireland's VCs  (Dept of Economic Development, 1995)
Monuments to Courage (David Harvey, 1999)
Irish Winners of the Victoria Cross (Richard Doherty & David Truesdale, 2000)
Sherlocks of Ireland

External links
 Military biography
Location of grave and VC medal (Kent)
Memorial to William Knox-Leet.

1833 births
1898 deaths
19th-century Irish people
Irish officers in the British Army
Military personnel from Dublin (city)
Irish recipients of the Victoria Cross
Somerset Light Infantry officers
British military personnel of the Third Anglo-Burmese War
Anglo-Zulu War recipients of the Victoria Cross
Companions of the Order of the Bath
British Army major generals
British military personnel of the Indian Rebellion of 1857
People from Dalkey
British Army personnel of the Anglo-Zulu War
British Army recipients of the Victoria Cross
Burials in Kent